Partha Sen (born 3 September 1956) is an Indian former cricketer. He played three first-class matches for Bengal in 1983/84.

See also
 List of Bengal cricketers

References

External links
 

1956 births
Living people
Indian cricketers
Bengal cricketers
People from Jamshedpur
Cricketers from Jharkhand